Benjamin Scott Nelson (born August 21, 1979) is a former American football wide receiver. He was signed by the Minnesota Vikings as an undrafted free agent in 2004 and played in 3 games on special teams. He played college football at St. Cloud State.

Nelson was also a member of the Colorado Crush and Cleveland Gladiators. He was the AFL Rookie of the Year in 2006.

On June 1, 2015, the SaberCats placed Nelson on reassignment. On June 2, 2015, he was claimed by the Spokane Shock. On June 3, 2015, Nelson was placed on recallable reassignment. On June 19, 2015, Nelson was assigned to the San Jose SaberCats.

References

1979 births
Living people
American football wide receivers
St. Cloud State Huskies football players
Minnesota Vikings players
San Jose SaberCats players
Colorado Crush players
Sioux Falls Storm players
Cleveland Gladiators players
Players of American football from Minnesota
People from Coon Rapids, Minnesota
Anoka High School alumni